The 1990 NHL Supplemental Draft was the fifth NHL Supplemental Draft. It was held on June 15, 1990.

Selections by round

Round one
The first round was limited to teams that missed the 1990 Stanley Cup playoffs.

Round two

See also
1990 NHL Entry Draft
1990–91 NHL season
List of NHL players

References

External links
 1990 NHL Supplemental Draft player stats at The Internet Hockey Database

1990
Draft